Dolní Pohleď is a municipality and village in Kutná Hora District in the Central Bohemian Region of the Czech Republic. It has about 100 inhabitants.

Administrative parts
The village of Měchonice is an administrative part of Dolní Pohleď.

References

Villages in Kutná Hora District